Zahid Hussain may refer to:

 Zahid Husain (banker) (1895–1957), Pakistani banker
 Zahid Hussain (author) (born 1972), British writer of fiction and poetry
 Zahid Hussain (cricketer) (born 1974), Canadian cricketer
 Zahid Hussain (journalist) (born 1949), Pakistani journalist and non-fiction author
 Rana Zahid Hussain (born 1954), politician in Pakistan's National Assembly
 Sayed Zahid Hussain (born 1949), Pakistani Supreme Court judge